The Aigle-class destroyers (contre-torpilleurs) were built for the French navy during the 1920s. They were very similar to the previous Guepard class, the only difference being improved machinery with higher pressure boilers, offering an additional  of speed and a new model 138 mm gun with a sliding breech block giving a higher rate of fire. The ships were named after birds.

Ships

 Aigle (Eagle; pennant numbers 5, 6 and X13)
Built by Ateliers et Chantiers de France, Dunkirk
Launched 19 February 1931
Completed 10 October 1932
Scuttled 27 November 1942
Refloated 10 July 1943.
Bombed and sunk 24 November 1943
Broken up in situ 1952.
 Vautour (Vulture; pennant numbers 6, 5, 73, X71)
Built by Forges et Chantiers de la Méditerranée, La Seyne
Launched 26 August 1930
Completed 2 May 1932
Scuttled 27 November 1942
Refloated 17 January 1943
Bombed and sunk 4 February 1944
Broken up in situ 1951
 Albatros (3, 2, 5, 72, X73, X77, F762, D614)
built by Ateliers et Chantiers de la Loire, Nantes
Launched 27 June 1930
Completed 25 December 1931
Decommissioned 9 September 1959
 Gerfaut (Gyrfalcon - 4, 71, X72)
Built by Ateliers et Chantiers de Bretagne, Nantes
Launched 14 June 1930
Completed 30 January 1932
Scuttled 27 November 1942
Refloated 1 June 1943.
Partly scrapped June–September 1943
Hulk bombed and sunk 7 March 1944
Broken up in situ 1948
 Milan (Kite - 1, 4, X113, X111)
Built by Arsenal de Lorient
Launched 13 October 1931
Completed 20 April 1934 -
On 8 November 1942, off Casablanca, she was hit by  shells from the US fleet and had to be beached.
 Épervier (Sparrowhawk - 2, 5, X112)
Built by Arsenal de Lorient,
Launched 14 August 1931
Completed 1 April 1934 - 
She was raised, and eventually broken up in 1946.

Service history
Three of the ships (Albatros, Épervier and Milan) were stationed in Morocco as part of the Vichy French navy, and engaged Allied forces in the battle of Casablanca during Operation Torch.  Along with the unfinished battleship , they engaged the Allied 'Covering Group', a taskforce based on the battleship . Milan and Épervier both ran aground after being damaged in the battle; Albatros was damaged but, after her capture, was repaired after the war and used as a gunnery training vessel. Aigle was scuttled at Toulon, France, on 27 November 1942. She was later refloated and sunk a second time by United States Army Air Forces bombers on 24 November 1943. Later she was salvaged and scrapped. Vautour and Gerfaut were also scuttled at Toulon, but Vautour was raised again and sunk during an air raid on 4 February 1944.

References

External links

 Aigle-class at uboat.net

Destroyer classes
World War II destroyers of France
 
Ship classes of the French Navy